Snapshot hyperspectral imaging is a method for capturing hyperspectral images during a single integration time of a detector array. No scanning is involved with this method and the lack of moving parts means that   motion artifacts should be avoided. This instrument typically features detector arrays with a high number of pixels.

Although the first known reference to a snapshot hyperspectral imaging device—the Bowen "image slicer"—dates from 1938, the concept was not successful until a larger amount of spatial resolution was available. With the arrival of large-format detector arrays in the late 1980s and early 1990s, a series of new snapshot hyperspectral imaging techniques were developed to take advantage of the new technology: a method which uses a fiber bundle at the image plane and reformatting the fibers in the opposite end of the bundle to a long line, viewing a scene through a 2D grating and reconstructing the multiplexed data with computed tomography mathematics, the (lenslet-based) integral field spectrograph, a modernized version of Bowen's image slicer. More recently, a number of research groups have attempted to advance the technology in order to create devices capable of commercial use. These newer devices include the HyperPixel Array imager a derivative of the integral field spectrograph, a multiaperture spectral filter approach, a compressive-sensing–based approach using a coded aperture, a microfaceted-mirror-based approach, a generalization of the Lyot filter, and a generalization of the Bayer filter approach to multispectral filtering.

While snapshot instruments are featured prominently in the research literature, none of these instruments have seen wide adoption in commercial use (i.e. outside the professional astronomical community) due to manufacturing limitations. Thus, their primary venue continues to be astronomical telescopes. One of the main reasons for the popularity of snapshot devices in the astronomical community is that they offer large increases in the light collection capacity of a telescope when performing hyperspectral imaging. Recent applications have been in soil spectroscopy and vegetation sciences.

See also 
Hyperspectral imaging
Imaging spectroscopy
Multi-spectral image
Chemical imaging
Imaging spectrometer
Spectral imaging
Computed tomography imaging spectrometer
Video spectroscopy

References 

Satellite meteorology
Remote sensing
Infrared imaging
Infrared spectroscopy